The 1997–98 ISU Junior Series was the first season of what was later named the ISU Junior Grand Prix, a series of international junior level competitions organized by the International Skating Union. It was designed to be a junior-level complement to the ISU Champions Series, which was for senior-level skaters. Skaters competed in the disciplines of men's singles, ladies' singles, pair skating, and ice dance. The top skaters from the series met at the Junior Series Final in Lausanne, Switzerland on March 5–8, 1998.

Competitions
The locations of the ISU Junior Grand Prix events change yearly. In the 1997–98 season, the series was composed of the following events:

Series notes
At the Junior Series Final, Timothy Goebel, the winner of the men's event, made history by becoming the first skater to land a quadruple salchow jump in competition. It was videotaped by the father of another skater.

Junior Series Final qualifiers
The following skaters qualified for the 1997–98 Junior Series Final, in order of qualification.

There were eight qualifiers in singles and six in pairs and ice dance.

Christel Borghi was given the host wildcard spot to the Junior Series Final. She placed 8th out of 8 competitors. Viktoria Volchkova withdrew before the competition with injury.

Medalists

Men

Ladies

Pairs

Ice dance

Medals table

References

External links
 1997–98 Results at Skate Canada
 1997–98 Results at Ice Skating International
 1997–98 ISU Junior Series at the Figure Skating Corner

ISU Junior Grand Prix
1997 in figure skating
1998 in figure skating